Cayrols is a commune in the Cantal department in south-central France.

Population

Notable people
 Gabrielle Petit (feminist) (1860–1952), feminist activist, anticlerical, libertarian socialist, newspaper editor

See also
Communes of the Cantal department

References

Communes of Cantal